La Celle-sous-Gouzon (literally La Celle under Gouzon) is a commune in the Creuse department in the Nouvelle-Aquitaine region in central France.

Geography

Population

Sights
 The church of St. Pierre and St. Paul, dating from the fifteenth century.

See also
Communes of the Creuse department

References

Communes of Creuse